Bono is a city in Craighead County, Arkansas, United States. The population was 2,131 at the 2010 census, up from 1,512 in 2000. It is included in the Jonesboro, Arkansas Metropolitan Statistical Area. Bono's most prominent landmarks are the Bono Bridge and the Bono Cemetery.

Geography
Bono is located in northwestern Craighead County at  (35.910612, -90.796788). The city of Walnut Ridge is  farther to the northwest along US 63.

List of highways
 
 U.S. Route 63 Business
 Arkansas Highway 230

Demographics

2020 census

As of the 2020 United States census, there were 2,409 people, 950 households, and 653 families residing in the city.

2000 census
As of the census of 2000, there were 1,512 people, 574 households, and 435 families residing in the city. The racial makeup of the city was 97.69% White, 0.13% Black or African American, 0.26% Native American, 0.07% Asian, 0.66% from other races, and 1.19% from two or more races.  1.72% of the population were Hispanic or Latino of any race. There were 574 households, out of which 42.9% had children under the age of 18 living with them, 54.7% were married couples living together, 16.6% had a female householder with no husband present, and 24.2% were non-families. 20.6% of all households were made up of individuals, and 6.6% had someone living alone who was 65 years of age or older. The average household size was 2.63 and the average family size was 3.05.

In the city, the population was spread out, with 31.1% under the age of 18, 10.4% from 18 to 24, 31.2% from 25 to 44, 19.6% from 45 to 64, and 7.7% who were 65 years of age or older.  The median age was 29 years. For every 100 females, there were 97.1 males.  For every 100 females age 18 and over, there were 90.5 males.

The median income for a household in the city was $31,307, and the median income for a family was $33,618. Males had a median income of $25,063 versus $18,426 for females. The per capita income for the city was $13,764.  About 13.6% of families and 15.2% of the population were below the poverty line, including 18.7% of those under age 18 and 13.8% of those age 65 or over.

Education
Bono residents are served by the Westside Consolidated School District. The district opened in 1966 after the Bono School District merged into it. Its high school is Westside High School.

Climate
Climate is characterized by relatively high temperatures and evenly distributed precipitation throughout the year.  The Köppen Climate Classification sub-type for this climate is "Cfa" (Humid Subtropical Climate).

References

External links

 Encyclopedia of Arkansas History & Culture entry: Bono (Craighead County)

Gallery

Cities in Arkansas
Cities in Craighead County, Arkansas
Jonesboro metropolitan area
Populated places established in 1916